Luciano Ercoli (October 19, 1929 – March 15, 2015) was an Italian film director, screenwriter, producer and unit production manager. Ercoli's career spanned approximately two decades before his retirement in the late 1970s, and saw him direct several films in the giallo genre, as well producing several Spaghetti Westerns. Ercoli was married to Spanish actress Nieves Navarro, who has appeared in several of the films he worked on.

Life and career 
Ercoli was born in Rome, Italy, on October 19, 1929. His first film credit was as an assistant director for the 1955 film La risaia, directed by Raffaello Matarazzo. Ercoli then acted as a film producer on several titles throughout the 1960s, before making his directorial début in 1970, helming the giallo film Le foto proibite di una signora per bene, which he also produced and edited. Ercoli went on to direct several more films throughout the early to mid-1970s, including Il figlio della sepolta viva and Troppo rischio per un uomo solo.

Ercoli was married to Spanish actress Nieves Navarro, who has appeared in several of his giallo films, starring in 1971's La morte cammina con i tacchi alti and 1972's La morte accarezza a mezzanotte. Navarro had also appeared in lesser roles in Le foto proibite di una signora per bene, and the Ercoli-produced Spaghetti Westerns Una pistola per Ringo and Il ritorno di Ringo. Ercoli, described as "one of the first directors to jump on the thriller bandwagon", retired from the film industry in the late 1970s after inheriting "a fortune". His last role was as the director of the 1975 poliziottesco film La polizia ha le mani legate.

Ercoli's final film was La Bidonata from 1977.  La Bidonata, also known as The Big Ripoff, was released as an extra on the DVD release of the Italian thriller Colt 38 Special Squad.

Filmography

Footnotes

References

External links 
 

1929 births
2015 deaths
Film directors from Rome
Spaghetti Western directors
Italian film producers
Italian screenwriters
Giallo film directors
Poliziotteschi directors
Italian male screenwriters